Institutionalized is the mixtape commercially released by Ras Kass.

Track listing

Samples
My Apology
"Instant Love" by Leon Ware
"Keep On Movin" by Soul II Soul
Shine
"Gone Hollywood" by Supertramp
"Can I Live" by Jay Z
We Run The Streets
"Baby Baby" by The Supremes
"Aint No Fun" by Snoop Dogg

References

Ras Kass albums
2005 albums
Albums produced by Scram Jones